Lattenkamp is a metro station on the Hamburg U-Bahn line U1. The station was opened in December 1914 and is located in the Winterhude district of Hamburg, Germany. Winterhude is part of the borough of Hamburg-Nord.

History
The metro station Lattenkamp was built during the years 1912 and 1913 as a part of the metro track between Kellinghusenstraße and Ohlsdorf, which is a part of Line U1 in today's time. The station building offering access to the platform was at the Meenkwiese originally. In the early 80s, the station was redesigned and a tunnel with staircases to the platform was built. Due to this change, the original entrance was closed and later demolished.

Service

Trains 
Lattenkamp is served by Hamburg U-Bahn line U1; departures are every 5 minutes.

See also 

 List of Hamburg U-Bahn stations

References

External links 

 Line and route network plans at hvv.de 

Hamburg U-Bahn stations in Hamburg
U1 (Hamburg U-Bahn) stations
Buildings and structures in Hamburg-Nord
Railway stations in Germany opened in 1914
Buildings and structures in Eimsbüttel
Transport infrastructure completed in 1914
Railway stations in Germany opened in 1991